A gladiator was an armed combatant entertainer in the Roman Republic and Roman Empire. 

Gladiator(s) or The Gladiator(s) may also refer to:

Arts and entertainment

Fictional characters
 Gladiator (Kallark), in Marvel Comics
 Gladiator (Melvin Potter), in Marvel Comics

Film
 Gladiator (2000 film), an epic historical drama 
 Gladiator (2000 soundtrack)
 Gladiator (1992 film), a boxing drama film
 Gladiator (1992 soundtrack)
 The Gladiator (1938 film), an adaptation of the Philip Wylie novel
 The Gladiator (1986 film), an American TV movie
 The Gladiators (film), a 1969 Swedish drama/science fiction film

Television
Gladiators (franchise), a sports entertainment television show
American Gladiators (1989 TV series)
American Gladiators (2008 TV series)
Gladiators 2000, a children's adaptation 
Gladiators (1992 British TV series)
Gladiators (2008 British TV series)
Gladiators (1995 Australian TV series)
Gladiators (2008 Australian TV series)
MTN Gladiators, the South African version
"Gladiator", an episode of Hercules: The Legendary Journeys

Gaming
 Gladiator, a 1986 computer game by Domark Limited
 Gladiator (video game), a 1986 arcade game by Taito
 Gladiator: Sword of Vengeance, a 2003 video game 
 Gladiator: Road to Freedom, a 2005 video game
 Gladiator A.D., a video game known later as Tournament of Legends

Literature
 Gladiator (novel), by Philip Wylie, 1930
 Gladiator (novel series), by Simon Scarrow
 The Gladiator (Scarrow novel),  2009
 The Gladiator (Turtledove novel), by Harry Turtledove, 2007
 The Gladiators (novel), by Arthur Koestler, 1939
 The Gladiators, an 1863 novel by George Whyte-Melville

Theatre
 The Gladiator (play), by Robert Montgomery Bird, premiered 1831

Music
 The Gladiators (band), a Jamaican roots reggae band
 , a Slovakian rock band, winner of the 8th ZAI Awards for vocal artist or ensemble

Albums
 Gladiator, a 2000 album by Unlord
 Gladiator (2000 soundtrack)
 Gladiator (1992 soundtrack)

Songs
 "The Gladiator March", by John Philip Sousa, 1886
 "Gladiator" (Dami Im song), 2014
 "Gladiator", a song by Nicola Roberts from the 2011 album Cinderella's Eyes
 "Gladiator", a 1992 song by The Jesus Lizard

Sports
 A.S.D. S.F. Gladiator 1912, an Italian football club 
 Cleveland Gladiators, an American arena football team
 Quetta Gladiators, a Pakistani cricket franchise
 Dhaka Gladiators, a Bangladeshi cricket franchise
 Atlanta Gladiators, an American hockey team 
 Mike Awesome, an American wrestler with ring name "The Gladiator"
 Ricky Hunter, a Canadian masked wrestler with ring name "The Gladiator"
 Omar Atlas, a retired Venezuelan professional wrestler with the ring name "Super Gladiator"
 "The Gladiators" (photograph), a notable Australian rugby league photograph
 Los Angeles Gladiators, an American esports team in the Overwatch League
 Los Súper Gladiadores, professional wrestling tag team from XWF
 Golden Gate Gladiators, South Africa field hockey club

Transportation and military
 Gladiator Cycle Company, a French manufacturer of bicycles, motorcycles and cars 1891–1920
 Gladiator Tactical Unmanned Ground Vehicle, an American unmanned vehicle
 Gloster Gladiator, a British biplane fighter aircraft designed in the 1930s
 Gladiator, the planned in-service name of the cancelled British MBT-80 tank project
 HMS Gladiator, the name of several ships of the Royal Navy
 Jeep Gladiator, the name of two pickup trucks
 USS Gladiator, the name of several U.S. Navy ships
 Yamaha Gladiator, a motorcycle

Other uses
 Gladiator (energy drink), a Mexican drink
 Gladiators motorcycle club, an American military motorcycle club
 Mantophasmatidae, carnivorous insects known as gladiators
 68th Armoured Regiment (India), nicknamed The Gladiators

See also
 
 
 
 Gladiatrix (disambiguation)
 Gladius (disambiguation)
 Gladiator War, the Roman slave uprising lead by Spartacus